Leonel Gerardo Vielma Peña (born 30 August 1978) is a Venezuelan football manager and former player who played as a defender.

International career
Born in Mérida, Vielma has played over 50 games for the Venezuela national team and has played club football in Venezuela and Colombia.

International goals

References

External links

International career details at rsssf

1978 births
Living people
Venezuelan footballers
Venezuela international footballers
2001 Copa América players
2004 Copa América players
2007 Copa América players
Estudiantes de Mérida players
UA Maracaibo players
Deportivo Táchira F.C. players
Deportivo Cali footballers
Caracas FC players
Once Caldas footballers
Deportivo Italia players
Independiente Santa Fe footballers
Venezuelan expatriate footballers
Venezuelan expatriate sportspeople in Colombia
Expatriate footballers in Colombia
Association football defenders
Venezuelan football managers
Venezuelan Primera División managers
Mineros de Guayana managers
Estudiantes de Mérida managers
People from Mérida, Mérida
Aragua F.C. managers